The Kenya National Library Service (KNLS) is a corporate body of the Kenyan government with a mandate to "promote, establish, equip, manage, maintain and develop libraries in Kenya". In its service provision, knls plays a dual role of Public Library and National library of Kenya.

knls was established in 1965 by an Act of Parliament of the Laws of Kenya to provide library and information services to the Kenyan public. In its service provision, knls plays a dual role of public library and national library of Kenya. The public library services are available in their 64 branches throughout Kenya, while the national library services are available at the headquarters in Nairobi.

Currently, the Kenya National Library Service is managed by the government under the Ministry of Youth, Sports and the Arts, State Department for Sports and the Arts, where the Cabinet Secretary is Hon Ababu Namwamba. He has taken over from Amb. (Dr.) Amina C. Mohamed who was the Cabinet Secretary for Sports, Culture and Heritage in the Uhuru Kenyatta Cabinet.

National Library Services in Kenya

National library services in Kenya are offered by Kenya National Library Service through the National Library Division (NLD). It serves as the repository for legal deposits in accordance with the Books and Newspapers Act Chapter (CAP) 111 of the laws of Kenya which facilitates the preservation of books, magazines, and other publications produced in the country.

According to books and newspaper Act (CAP 111) statute law, Miscellaneous Amendment No. 22 of 1989, the publishers of every book printed and published in Kenya “shall before or within fourteen days after publication of the book, at his own expense deliver to the Registrar such number of copies thereof, not exceeding three in number. And in order to facilitate the publication of the national bibliography of Kenya under 4 (k) of the Kenya National Library Service Board Act, before or within fourteen days, deliver to the Director, Kenya National Library Service, two copies.

The National Library Division of the Library Service is charged with annually publishing the Kenya National Bibliography which contains a list of bibliographic resources, print or audio-visual acquired as legal deposit. The bibliography was first proposed in 1975. Kenya National Bibliography is published annually by the National Library and contains list of bibliographic resources, print or audio-visual acquired as legal deposit. The Legal Deposit Act mandates publishers, to deposit two copies to the Director National library and three copies to the registrar of books and newspapers. All these materials are then published in the Kenya National Bibliography (KNB). The organization maintains a database of Kenya’s intellectual output with the aim of achieving effective National Bibliographic Control in line with the principle of Universal Bibliographic Control. Kenya National Bibliography serves as a selection tool for scholars, lecturers, students’, librarians among others. National Libraries over the ages have been potent instrument for creation, acquisition and dissemination of local content thereby preserving and promoting transmission of cultural practices and values from one generation to another. They are reservoir of recorded knowledge of a community, which is being preserved for posterity. The bibliography was last published in 2018.

The National Library Division is also the sole issuer of International Standard Book Numbers (ISBN) and International Standard Music Numbers (ISMN) for print music. knls subscribes to thousands of e-journals, e-books and other e-resource sites and has a stock of specialized collection of government publications dating back to 1980. In addition it also acts as a data information centre for the World Bank.

History
Public libraries in Kenya have existed since the beginning of the 18th century. These however, were mainly subscription libraries that relied heavily on endowments, members' subscriptions and limited grants from both local and central government. The libraries were exclusively for Europeans and Asians.

The first public library, Seif Bin Salim Public Library and Free Reading Area in Mombasa, was established in 1903. It was financed by Seif Bin Salim, the son of the then "Liwali" (Arab Governor) of Mombasa, Salim bin Khalfan, The McMillan Memorial Library in Nairobi was the second public library. It was built in 1931 in memory of Lord William Northrop Mcmillan who was among the first settlers in Kenya. The library was built through funding from the Carnegie Corporation of New York through the efforts of Macmillan's widow, Lucie. Initially, the library was meant for Europeans and Asians. The third public library  was the Desai Memorial Library which was built in 1942. It only offered services exclusively to Asians until the 1960s.

In the late 1950s and 1960s, the British Council and the American Cultural Centre provided limited public library services across racial lines. These libraries did not cater for the information needs of the Africans until after independence. Following the recommendations of the East African Library Association and the report of Sidney Hockey, a British Council Library consultant In 1948, Elspeth Huxley who was an author, journalist, broadcaster, environmentalist and government advisor of the colonial government in Kenya.

In 1960, a report recommending a centralized state-supported public library system for Kenya was made. That same year, The Macmillan Memorial Library was handed over to the Nairobi City Council , which opened it to everyone.   During this same period, the Desai Library was also opened to the general public.

In 1965,  an act establishing Kenya National Library Service was passed.

Provision of information for development through the national and public library network enables people to fight poverty deprivation and illiteracy and thus supports reading and recovery programs by the government. Rural and urban poor communities are better able to tackle their problems and introduce social change if they have access to relevant information that meets their needs and interests. In addition, access to information about the country enables citizens to participate effectively in the art of governance.

Through various reading campaigns, knls provides opportunities for communities to enhance their reading and information seeking habits, and therefore sustain literacy. The 2006 Kenya National Adult Literacy Survey estimated the national literacy rate at 61.5% indicating that only 38.5% Kenyan adults were illiterate. The survey also revealed that only 29.6% of the adult population had acquired the desired mastery level of literacy. This meant that the majority of those termed as literate (61.5%) were at risk of losing their literacy skills or could not effectively perform within the context of knowledge economies.

However, a country with effective library and information services will achieve continuity in learning and reading beyond the formal school program. Such systems cannot be explained any better than ensuring that library services are accessible to as many Kenyans as possible throughout the country. Public libraries go beyond formal education and they are at the heart of personal and community development. knls promotes reading by providing access to relevant reading materials to all communities. Libraries play a major role in stimulating public interest in books and in promoting reading for knowledge, information and enjoyment – thus knls is indeed a “people’s university.”

Core functions of the knls Board 
According to Kenya National Library Service Board Act CAP. 225 of the Laws of Kenya, knls has the following core functions:

 Acquire books and information sources produced in and outside Kenya and such other materials for a National Library
 Preserve and conserve the national imprint for reference and research and maintain the National Bibliographic Control through issuance of the publication of the Kenya National Bibliography Kenya Periodicals Directory and ISBN.
 Promote, establish, equip, manage and maintain libraries in Kenya as a National Library Service; 
 Plan and Coordinate library, documentation and related services in Kenya 
 Advice the Government, local authorities and other public bodies on all matters relating to library, documentation and related services. 
 Provide facilities for the study of, and for training in the principles, procedures, and techniques of librarianship and such other related subjects as the Board may determine 
 Sponsor, arrange or provide facilities for conferences and seminars for discussion on matters in connection with library and related services 
 Carry out and encourage research in the development of library and related services

Services
The library offers the following services;
 Adult, junior and institutional lending
 Mobile library services
 Inter-library lending
 Advisory on library services
 Technical assistance on library development to interested government and private institutions
 Free access to computers and Internet connectivity
 Health information
 Services to visually impaired persons
 User education
 Digitization services
 Board games for users above 14 years old
 Data center services

knls Network within the country and county 

Kenya National Library Service (Maktaba Kuu Building)
Community Area, Ngong Road  
P.O. Box 30573-00100
NAIROBI

See also
List of libraries in Kenya

References

External links 
 http://www.knls.ac.ke/ Official site
 http://www.eifl.net/kenya-national-library-service
 http://www.goethe.de/ins/ke/nai/kul/mag/bib/bil/en9853827.htm
 http://www.cck.go.ke/consumers/consumer_protection/downloads/pwd-presentations/Promoting_accessible_information_in_public_libraries.pdf
 http://www.jambonairobi.co.ke/services/public-information-services/public-libraries/
 http://www.g-youth.org/main/index.php/partners/knls.html
 http://www.libdex.com/country/kenya/nairobi/library_35146.html
 http://www.worlib.org/vol04no1/rosenberg_v04n1.shtml
 http://www.standardmedia.co.ke/?articleID=2000089713&story_title=knls-library-to-take-narok-to-new-literacy-levels
 http://www.kenyanewsagency.go.ke/index.php?option=com_content&view=article&id=562:library-services&catid=1:headline-news
 https://www.scribd.com/doc/157626426/157375909-Knls-Branch-Network-on-the-Map-Timothy-Mahea?secret_password=7oeajsvhrus9uogmum1
 Royal Library of Alexandria
 Book Aid International

1965 establishments in Kenya
Government agencies established in 1965
Kenya
Education in Kenya
Government of Kenya
Libraries established in 1965
Libraries in Kenya